Cycling was contested at the 1966 Asian Games in Bangkok, Thailand from December 11 to 20.

Medalists

Road

Track

Medal table

References
Medalists Road
Medalists Track

 
1966 Asian Games events
1966
Asian Games
1966 in road cycling
1966 in track cycling
International cycle races hosted by Thailand